Clifton is a city in Wayne County, Tennessee, on the state's south central border with Alabama. It developed as a river port along the Tennessee River in the 19th century. Its historic districts listed on the National Register of Historic Places are associated with this period. The population was 2,694 at the 2010 census.

Overview
The city operates the T. S. Stribling Museum in honor of its most famous resident, T. S. Stribling. Highly popular in the 1920s and 1930s, this author won the Pulitzer Prize for the Novel in 1933 for The Store, his second work of the Vaiden trilogy. The house is located in the Water Street Historic District, associated with the port past, and is listed on the National Register of Historic Places.

The state's South Central Correctional Facility is located in Clifton. A privately run medium-security prison, it has capacity for 1700 adult male offenders.

Geography
Clifton is located at  (35.382777, -87.992060).

Demographics

2020 census

As of the 2020 United States census, there were 2,651 people, 450 households, and 268 families residing in the city.

2000 census
As of the census of 2000, there were 2,699 people, 353 households, and 223 families residing in the city. The population density was 420.1 people per square mile (162.3/km2). There were 392 housing units at an average density of 61.0 per square mile (23.6/km2). The racial makeup of the city was 59.69% White, 39.42% African American, 0.11% Native American, 0.04% Asian, 0.44% from other races, and 0.30% from two or more races. Hispanic or Latino of any race were 0.85% of the population.

There were 353 households, out of which 26.1% had children under the age of 18 living with them, 47.0% were married couples living together, 12.7% had a female householder with no husband present, and 36.8% were non-families. 34.0% of all households were made up of individuals, and 12.5% had someone living alone who was 65 years of age or older. The average household size was 2.28 and the average family size was 2.93.

In the city, the population was spread out, with 7.0% under the age of 18, 13.3% from 18 to 24, 56.2% from 25 to 44, 17.7% from 45 to 64, and 5.9% who were 65 years of age or older. The median age was 35 years. For every 100 females, there were 561.5 males. For every 100 females age 18 and over, there were 684.7 males.

The median income for a household in the city was $22,500, and the median income for a family was $35,000. Males had a median income of $36,848 versus $19,318 for females. The per capita income for the city was $13,780. About 15.4% of families and 22.0% of the population were below the poverty line, including 26.5% of those under age 18 and 21.3% of those age 65 or over.

Education
Frank Hughes College (No longer in operation)
Frank Hughes School
Columbia State Community College

Radio station
There is one radio station located in Clifton (106.5 FM, "Sunny 106.5") WLVS-FM.  The station is owned by the Gold Coast Broadcasting Company and airs an Adult Contemporary music format.

Notable people
T. S. Stribling, notable as an American writer, is known for The Vaiden Trilogy, of which the second novel, The Store, won the Pulitzer Prize for the Novel in 1933.

Robert Selph Henry, railroad executive and historian.

Businesses
This is an incomplete list

Banks
Peoples Bank
Wayne County Bank

Stores
Clifton One Stop (Convenience Store)
Cross-eyed Cricket (Convenience Store)
Country Girls Truck Stop (Convenience Store and Restaurant)
Dollar General

Medical and related
Clifton Medical Associates
Lifespan Health
Willoughby Drugs

Other businesses
Advanced Plastics
American Telephone Exchange
Clifton Game Room
Craft Book Binding
Burns Trucking Company
Bear Inn (Lodge)
United States Postal Service
Clifton RV & Marina (Restaurant & Bar) https://www.cliftonmarina.com/
Commodore Inn at Clifton (Historical B&B) https://www.commodoreinnclifton.com/

Manufacturing
American Whirlpool
Brown Foreman (A Stave Mill)
Cross Brand Leather
Clifton Motel

Transportation

Highways
 (U.S. Route 641 and unsigned State Route 114)
 (State Route 128)
 (State Route 228)

Aviation

References

External links
 

Cities in Tennessee
Cities in Wayne County, Tennessee
Tennessee populated places on the Tennessee River